Dendostrea frons, the frond oyster, is a species of bivalve mollusc in the family Ostreidae.

Distribution
It can be found along the Atlantic Coast of North America, ranging from North Carolina to the West Indies. In 2013 this oyster was found in Ireland in Co. Kerry. The only previous record from Ireland is from Co Mayo.

References

Ostreidae
Molluscs described in 1758
Taxa named by Carl Linnaeus